This Angry Age (also known as The Sea Wall, Barrage contre le Pacifique and La diga sul Pacifico) is a 1957 Italian-American drama film directed by René Clément, produced by Dino De Laurentiis, and starring Anthony Perkins and Silvana Mangano. It is an adaptation of Marguerite Duras' 1950 novel, The Sea Wall. The original novel was adapted again in 2008 by Rithy Panh as The Sea Wall, starring Isabelle Huppert.

Plot
Twenty-year-old Joseph (Perkins) and  his sixteen-year-old sister  Suzanne (Mangano) live in the merciless conditions of an intemperate foreign land with their widowed mother (Van Fleet). Their mother attempts to exert a hold on her children by involving them in the family's run-down rice plantation. However the siblings seek liberation, and look for this in their romantic lives. Suzanne becomes involved with Michael (Conte) and Joseph finds a love interest in Claude (Valli).

Cast
Anthony Perkins as Joseph Dufresne
Silvana Mangano as Suzanne Dufresne
Richard Conte as Michael
Jo Van Fleet as Mme. Dufresne
Alida Valli as Claude
Nehemiah Persoff as Albert
Yvonne Sanson as Carmen
Guido Celano as Bart

Production
Clément purchased the film rights to the Duras novel in 1956. The original male lead was supposed to have been James Dean, but he was replaced by Perkins. Mangano, the wife of the film's producer, was cast in the female lead.

Clément shot the film in wide-screen Technirama and Technicolor. He was unable to film in Indochina, the setting of the original novel, as it no longer existed. Nor could he film in the newly independent Vietnam, as nationalist struggles continued there. Thus, Clément reconstructed the story's setting in Thailand.

Reception
The New York Times described Clément as "a specialist in that sort of tragedy that evolves from the inability of deeply pained people to face their own feelings." The reviewer also praised the "great pictorial beauty and admirable psychological truth" of Clément's film. The reviewer also praised how the "crumbling of the dam against the assaults of the river stands as an image of what is going on within the family."

The film was also a critical success in France, being lauded as "a complete success, a chef-d'œuvre", although François Truffaut did not share this enthusiasm, accusing  Clément of directing "his career". He added that "For Clément, the essential thing is that the film he is making costs more than the last one and less than the next."

Duras was dismayed by the absence of certain colonial themes that were important in her novel. She said she felt "betrayed" and "dishonoured" by the film.

See also
 List of American films of 1958

References

External links
 

1957 drama films
1957 films
American drama films
French drama films
Italian drama films
Films based on French novels
Films based on works by Marguerite Duras
Films shot in Thailand
Columbia Pictures films
Films directed by René Clément
Films produced by Dino De Laurentiis
Films with screenplays by Irwin Shaw
Films set in French Indochina
English-language French films
English-language Italian films
1950s English-language films
1950s American films
1950s Italian films
1950s French films